José Nieto Velázquez was the queen's chamberlain, or an attendant on a sovereign or lord in his bedchamber, during the 1650s, and he was also in charge of the royal tapestry works. 

He is also the figure in the doorway in Diego Velázquez's painting Las Meninas and may have been a relative of the artist. Although the focus of Las Meninas is highly debated, the vanishing point of the whole painting is José Nieto Velázquez as he stands in the staircase. More specifically, the crook of his arm is the exact vanishing point. He seems to be paused, one foot resting on a step while his weight is on his other leg on a different step. It is unknown if he is coming or going from the stairs.

References 

17th-century Spanish people
Year of birth missing
Year of death missing
Spanish courtiers